
Gmina Solec Kujawski is an urban-rural gmina (administrative district) in Bydgoszcz County, Kuyavian-Pomeranian Voivodeship, in north-central Poland.

Villages
Apart from the town of Solec Kujawski, Gmina Solec Kujawski contains the villages and settlements of Chrośna, Makowiska, Otorowo and Przyłubie.

Neighbouring gminas
Gmina Solec Kujawski is bordered by the city of Bydgoszcz and by the gminas of Nowa Wieś Wielka, Rojewo, Wielka Nieszawka and Zławieś Wielka.

References
Polish official population figures 2006

Solec Kujawski
Bydgoszcz County